Caulfield Racecourse is one of Melbourne, Australia's best-known horse-racing tracks.  Commonly known as "The Heath" by local racegoers, It is home to the Melbourne Racing Club.

Horse-racing started there in 1859 on a bush track where the Melbourne Hunt Club met.  A racecourse was then laid out on the site of the club's dog kennels.  The Victoria Amateur Turf Club was then established in 1876 and the first Caulfield Cup race was run in 1879.

All turns have a 4% to 6% banking. Racing takes place in an anti-clockwise direction. The totally glassed in Rupert Clarke stand provides an uninterrupted view of the racecourse.

Caulfield has about 25 race days each season and hosts some of the Australia's most famous and historic races including the Caulfield Cup, Caulfield Guineas, Blue Diamond Stakes, C F Orr Stakes, Oakleigh Plate, Underwood Stakes and Futurity Stakes.

Caulfield Racecourse Reserve is located nine kilometres from the Melbourne CBD, on the boundary of Caulfield and Caulfield East in Melbourne's south eastern suburbs.  The Reserve was set aside for three purposes, racing, recreation and a public park.  The Caulfield Racecourse Reserve Act 2017, established a Trust to plan for the future of the reserve, develop and maintain the reserve.  https://www.crrt.org.au/

The Trust reports publicly on its activities through an Annual Report which is reported to the Victorian Parliament and available on the Trust's Web page. https://www.crrt.org.au/

The Land Management Plan sets a bold vision for the future of the Reserve as a place for everyone is also available on the Trust's Web page.

Transport
The reserve is on Melbourne tram route 3 and the journey takes about 35 minutes from the city centre.

Caulfield railway station is less than a hundred metres from the racecourse and is located on the Frankston, Cranbourne and Pakenham lines.  Trains depart every 10 minutes from Flinders Street station in the Melbourne CBD.

Caulfield Racecourse provides disabled carparks opposite the main entrance on Station Street. Lift access to grandstands and disabled toilets is available. There is also a baby change room and first aid facilities.

Reconstruction
After the 1995 Caulfield Cup the track had major reconstruction of the course proper and re-opened in April 1996.

The new racing surface has been cambered from the outside running rail with the crown of the track at the outside running rail. The banking on the turn into the home straight is 4 percent, while the other turns have an equivalent banking of 2 percent.

Further to the major works in 1996, the Caulfield track was re-laid in 2005 immediately preceding the Caulfield Cup Carnival and resumed racing for the Summer Classics Carnival, in February 2006.

Races

The following is a list of Group races which are run at Caulfield Racecourse.

Examinations
Aside from its use for racing, the Caulfield Racecourse is also used by the VCAA to examine students who are unable to attend examinations at their schools as well as by Open Universities Australia (OUA) and its universities for the end of the study period examinations. The facility is also used for end of semester examinations by universities such as Monash University. The UMAT is also held at Caulfield Racecourse.

References

External links
Caulfield Racecourse report
Caulfield Racecourse details
Caulfield Racecourse stables
Melbourne Racing Club
Disability information
Caulfield Racecourse Reserve Trust

 
Horse racing venues in Australia
Sports venues in Melbourne
Sport in the City of Glen Eira
Buildings and structures in the City of Glen Eira